Dénes Mihály (7 July 1894, Gödöllő – 29 August 1953, West-Berlin) was a Hungarian inventor, engineer.

Mihály graduated as a mechanical engineer at the Technical University in Budapest. During his high school studies – at the age of 16 – he published books on automobiles and motorcycles. After university he began experimenting with television technology at the Telephone factory. His first conception of a television construction in 1919 was called the "Telehor", which was capable of transmitting still pictures over a distance of many kilometers. From 1924 he continued his experiments at the Allgemeine Elektrizitäts-Gesellschaft in Berlin with still pictures, later transferring the results to motion pictures. He established a company called "TELEHOR AG" to manufacture television sets.

In 1935 the Mihály–Traub television set appeared on the market, which he jointly developed with the physicist E. H. Traub. One of Dénes Mihály's most significant inventions was the "Projectophon", patented in 1922, which received recognition in the field of sound picture. During the course of his life he created many more important inventions in the field of television.

References

External links

Dénes Mihály
History of television
The Development of the Television
Mihály-Traub Scanner

1894 births
1953 deaths
20th-century Hungarian inventors
Hungarian electrical engineers
Television pioneers